Klaić is a Croatian surname. Notable people with the surname include:
 Bratoljub Klaić, Croatian linguist and writer
 Miho Klaić, Croatian politician
 Miro Klaić, footballer from Bosnia and Herzegovina
 Nada Klaić, Croatian historian
, Croatian sculptor
 Vjekoslav Klaić, Croatian historian and writer